Georges Perec  (7 March 1936 – 3 March 1982) was a French novelist, filmmaker, documentalist, and essayist. He was a member of the Oulipo group. His father died as a soldier early in the Second World War and his mother was killed in the Holocaust. Many of his works deal with absence, loss, and identity, often through word play.

Early life
Born in a working-class district of Paris, Perec was the only son of Icek Judko and Cyrla (Schulewicz) Peretz, Polish Jews who had emigrated to France in the 1920s. He was a distant relative of the Yiddish writer Isaac Leib Peretz. Perec's father, who enlisted in the French Army during World War II, died in 1940 from untreated gunfire or shrapnel wounds, and his mother was killed in the Holocaust, probably in Auschwitz sometime after 1943. Perec was taken into the care of his paternal aunt and uncle in 1942, and in 1945, he was formally adopted by them.

Career
In 1958/59 Perec served in the army as a paratrooper (XVIIIe Régiment de Chasseurs Parachutistes), and married Paulette Petras after being discharged. They spent one year (1960/1961) in Sfax, Tunisia, where Paulette worked as a teacher; these experiences are reflected in Things: A Story of the Sixties, which is about a young Parisian couple who also spend a year in Sfax.

In 1961 Perec began working at the Neurophysiological Research Laboratory in the unit's research library funded by the CNRS and attached to the Hôpital Saint-Antoine as an archivist, a low-paid position which he retained until 1978. A few reviewers have noted that the daily handling of records and varied data may have had an influence on his literary style. In any case, Perec's work on the reassessment of the academic journals under subscription was influenced by a talk about the handling of scientific information given by Eugene Garfield in Paris and he was introduced to Marshall McLuhan by Jean Duvignaud. Perec's other major influence was the Oulipo, which he joined in 1967, meeting Raymond Queneau, among others. Perec dedicated his masterpiece, La Vie mode d'emploi (Life: A User's Manual) to Queneau, who died before it was published.

Perec began working on a series of radio plays with his translator Eugen Helmle and the musician  in the late 60s; less than a decade later, he was making films. Perec also created crossword puzzles for Le Point from 1976 on.

La Vie mode d'emploi (1978) brought Perec some financial and critical success—it won the Prix Médicis—and allowed him to turn to writing full-time. He was a writer-in-residence at the University of Queensland, Australia, in 1981 during which time he worked on 53 Jours (53 Days), which he would not finish. Shortly after his return from Australia, his health deteriorated. A heavy smoker, he was diagnosed with lung cancer. He died the following year in Ivry-sur-Seine at age 45, four days shy of his 46th birthday; his ashes are held at the columbarium of the Père Lachaise Cemetery.

Work

Many of Perec's novels and essays abound with experimental word play, lists and attempts at classification, and they are usually tinged with melancholy.

Perec's first novel Les Choses (published in English as Things: A Story of the Sixties) (1965) was awarded the Prix Renaudot.

Perec's most famous novel La Vie mode d'emploi (Life A User's Manual) was published in 1978. Its title page describes it as "novels", in the plural, the reasons for which become apparent on reading. La Vie mode d'emploi is a tapestry of interwoven stories and ideas as well as literary and historical allusions, based on the lives of the inhabitants of a fictitious Parisian apartment block. It was written according to a complex plan of writing constraints, and is primarily constructed from several elements, each adding a layer of complexity. The 99 chapters of his 600-page novel move like a knight's tour of a chessboard around the room plan of the building, describing the rooms and stairwell and telling the stories of the inhabitants. At the end, it is revealed that the whole book actually takes place in a single moment, with a final twist that is an example of "cosmic irony". It was translated into English by David Bellos in 1987.

Perec is noted for his constrained writing. His 300-page novel La disparition (1969) is a lipogram, written with natural sentence structure and correct grammar, but using only words that do not contain the letter "e". It has been translated into English by Gilbert Adair under the title A Void (1994). His novella Les revenentes (1972) is a complementary univocalic piece in which the letter "e" is the only vowel used. This constraint affects even the title, which would conventionally be spelt Revenantes. An English translation by Ian Monk was published in 1996 as The Exeter Text: Jewels, Secrets, Sex in the collection Three. It has been remarked by Jacques Roubaud that these two novels draw words from two disjoint sets of the French language, and that a third novel would be possible, made from the words not used so far (those containing both "e" and a vowel other than "e").

W ou le souvenir d'enfance, (W, or the Memory of Childhood, 1975) is a semi-autobiographical work which is hard to classify. Two alternating narratives make up the volume: one, a fictional outline of a remote island country called "W", at first appears to be a utopian society modeled on the Olympic ideal, but is gradually exposed as a horrifying, totalitarian prison much like a concentration camp. The second narrative is a description of Perec's own childhood during and after World War II. Both narratives converge towards the end, highlighting the common theme of the Holocaust.

"Cantatrix sopranica L. Scientific Papers" is a spoof scientific paper detailing experiments on the "yelling reaction" provoked in sopranos by pelting them with rotten tomatoes. All the references in the paper are multi-lingual puns and jokes, e.g. "(Karybb & Szyla, 1973)".

David Bellos, who has translated several of Perec's works, wrote an extensive biography of Perec: Georges Perec: A Life in Words, which won the Académie Goncourt's bourse for biography in 1994.

The Association Georges Perec has extensive archives on the author in Paris.

In 1992 Perec's initially rejected novel Gaspard pas mort (Gaspard not dead), which was believed to be lost, was found by David Bellos amongst papers in the house of Perec's friend . The novel was reworked several times and retitled  and published in 2012; its English translation by Bellos followed in 2014 as Portrait of a Man after the 1475 painting of that name by Antonello da Messina. The initial title borrows the name Gaspard from the Paul Verlaine poem "Gaspar Hauser Chante" (inspired by Kaspar Hauser, from the 1881 collection Sagesse) and characters named "Gaspard" appear in both W, or the Memory of Childhood and Life: A User's Manual, while in MICRO-TRADUCTIONS, 15 variations discrètes sur un poème connu he creatively re-writes the Verlaine poem 15 times.

Honours
Asteroid no. 2817, discovered in 1982, was named after Perec. In 1994, a street in the 20th arrondissement of Paris was named after him, . The French postal service issued a stamp in 2002 in his honour; it was designed by Marc Taraskoff and engraved by Pierre Albuisson. For his work, Perec won the Prix Renaudot in 1965, the Prix Jean Vigo in 1974, the Prix Médicis in 1978. He was featured as a Google Doodle on his 80th birthday.

Works

Books
The most complete bibliography of Perec's works is Bernard Magné's Tentative d'inventaire pas trop approximatif des écrits de Georges Perec (Toulouse, Presses Universitaires du Mirail, 1993).

Films
Un homme qui dort, 1974 (with Bernard Queysanne, English title: The Man Who Sleeps)
Les Lieux d'une fugue, 1975
Série noire (Alain Corneau, 1979)
Ellis Island (TV film with Robert Bober)

References

Further reading
Biographies
 Georges Perec: A Life in Words by David Bellos (1993)

Criticism
The Poetics of Experiment: A Study of the Work of Georges Perec by Warren Motte (1984)
Perec ou les textes croisés by J. Pedersen (1985). In French.
Pour un Perec lettré, chiffré by J.-M. Raynaud (1987). In French.
Georges Perec by Claude Burgelin (1988). In French.
 Georges Perec: Traces of His Passage by Paul Schwartz (1988)
 Perecollages 1981–1988 by Bernard Magné (1989). In French.
 La Mémoire et l'oblique by Philippe Lejeune (1991). In French.
 Georges Perec: Ecrire Pour Ne Pas Dire by Stella Béhar (1995). In French.
 Poétique de Georges Perec: «...une trace, une marque ou quelques signes» by Jacques-Denis Bertharion (1998) In French.
 Georges Perec Et I'Histoire, ed. by Carsten Sestoft & Steen Bille Jorgensen (2000). In French.
 La Grande Catena. Studi su "La Vie mode d'emploi" by Rinaldo Rinaldi (2004). In Italian.

External links
L'Association Georges Perec, in French
Je me souviens de Georges Perec – comprehensive site in French by Jean-Benoît Guinot, with extensive bibliography of secondary material and links
 
Université McGill: le roman selon les romanciers (French)  Inventory and analysis of Georges Perec non-novelistic writings about the novel
Reading Georges Perec, by Warren Motte

 
Georges Perèc o la Literatura como Arte Combinatoria. Instrucciones de uso | in Spanish | by Adolfo Vasquez Rocca
Pensar y clasificar; Georges Perèc, escritor y trapecista | in Spanish | by Adolfo Vasquez Rocca PhD

1936 births
1982 deaths
Burials at Père Lachaise Cemetery
Writers from Paris
Oulipo members
French people of Polish-Jewish descent
Puzzle designers
20th-century French Jews
Jewish French writers
French Holocaust survivors
Prix Médicis winners
Prix Renaudot winners
Postmodern writers
French adoptees
20th-century French novelists
French male novelists
Deaths from lung cancer in France
20th-century French male writers
Go (game) writers
Crossword compilers